Milan Uzelac (born 28 August 1932) was a Bosnian politician who was the 7th President of the League of Communists of Bosnia and Herzegovina from June 1986 until May 1988. He died in London on 6 July 2005.

Biography
Uzelac was born on 28 August 1932 in Bihać, Kingdom of Yugoslavia. He graduated from the Faculty of Philosophy in Sarajevo.

He was the president of the Central Committee of the People's Committee of Bosnia and Herzegovina from 1956 until 1963, Secretary for education and culture of BiH from 1963 to 1967, president of the Republic of Education Union of SR Bosnia and Herzegovina, deputy of the Council of Peoples of the Federal Assembly of Yugoslavia from 1969. Later on in his life, Mutapčić served as the 7th President of the Presidency of the Central Committee of the League of Communists of Bosnia and Herzegovina from June 1986 until May 1988.

He died on 6 July 2005 in London, aged 72.

References
Notes

Books

Yugoslav Contemporaries: Who's Who in Yugoslavia. "Chronometar", Belgrade, 1970, p. 1110.

1932 births
2005 deaths
Politicians from Bihać
Bosnia and Herzegovina politicians
League of Communists of Bosnia and Herzegovina politicians